St. Bernard's Church is a historic stone masonry church at 44 University Avenue in Akron, Ohio.

History 
The original church was built in 1861, on the current site of the National Inventors Hall of Fame STEM High School. The current church building was begun in 1902, and opened in 1905. The church's interior was decorated by Rambusch Decorating Company.

It features a German Baroque Romanesque style. St. Bernard Church was added to the National Register of Historic Places in 1989. The church was designed by noted Akron-born architect William P. Ginther, whose legacy of prominent Catholic church buildings is particularly robust in his native Ohio and neighboring states.

References

External links
 Official website

Roman Catholic churches completed in 1905
Churches on the National Register of Historic Places in Ohio
Romanesque Revival church buildings in Ohio
Churches in Akron, Ohio
National Register of Historic Places in Summit County, Ohio
Churches in Summit County, Ohio
Churches in the Roman Catholic Diocese of Cleveland
1861 establishments in Ohio
20th-century Roman Catholic church buildings in the United States